The Marine Insurance Act 1906 (8 Edw. 7 c.41) is a UK Act of Parliament regulating marine insurance. The Act applies both to "ship & cargo" marine insurance, and to P&I cover.

The Act was drafted by Sir Mackenzie Dalzell Chalmers, who had earlier drafted the Sale of Goods Act 1893. The Act is a codifying act, that is to say, it attempts to collate existing common law and present it in a statutory (i.e. “codified”) form.  In the event, the Act did more than merely codify the law, and some new elements were introduced in 1906. The Marine Insurance Act 1906 has been highly influential, as it  governs not merely English Law, but it also dominates marine insurance worldwide through its wholesale adoption by other jurisdictions.

Two modern statutes, the Consumer Insurance (Disclosure and Representations) Act 2012 (“CIDRA”) and the Insurance Act 2015 have made amendments to the law of insurance.

Overview
The most important sections of this Act include:

s.4: a policy without insurable interest is void.

s.17: imposes a duty on the insured of uberrimae fides (as opposed to caveat emptor); i.e. that questions must be answered honestly and the risk not misrepresented.

s.18: the proposer of the insurer has a duty to disclose all material facts relevant to the acceptance and rating of the risk. Failure to do so is known as non-disclosure or concealment (there are minor differences in the two terms) and renders the insurance voidable by the insurer.

s.33(3): If [a warranty] be not [exactly] complied with, then, subject to any express provision in the policy, the insurer is discharged from liability as from the date of the breach of warranty, but without prejudice to any liability incurred by him before that date.

s.34(2): where a warranty has been broken, it is no defence to the insured that the breach has been remedied, and the warranty complied with, prior to the loss.

s.34(3): a breach of warranty may be waived by the insurer.

s.50: a policy may be assigned. Typically, a shipowner might assign the benefit of a policy to the ship-mortgagor.

ss.60-63: deals with the issues of a constructive total loss. The insured can, by notice, claim for a constructive total loss with the insurer becoming entitled to the ship or cargo if it should later turn up. (By contrast an actual total loss describes the physical destruction of a vessel or cargo.)

s.79: deals with subrogation; ie. the rights of the insurer to stand in the shoes of an indemnified insured and recover salvage for his own benefit.

Schedule 1 of the Act contains a list of definitions; schedule 2 contains the model policy wording.

Reform
Two new statutes, the Consumer Insurance (Disclosure and Representations) Act 2012 (“CIDRA”) and the Insurance Act 2015 have addressed insurance in general, and have amended the law in several ways.

Part 5 of the  Insurance Act 2015 addresses  "Good faith" as follows:
 Section 14 provides that "any rule of law permitting a party to a contract of insurance to avoid the contract on the ground that utmost good faith has not been observed by the other party is abolished.
 Accordingly, s,14(3) amends s.17 of the Marine Insurance Act 1906 to read: "A contract of marine insurance is a contract based upon the utmost good faith"  and that section's subsequent words: "and, if the utmost good faith be not observed by either party, the contract may be avoided by the other party" are now omitted.

See also
 Airmic
 UK commercial law
 Marine insurance
 Seaworthiness (law)

Notes

 

United Kingdom Acts of Parliament 1906
United Kingdom contract law
Insurance legislation
Marine insurance